Marion Havighurst (née Boyd, January 6, 1894 – February 24, 1974) was an American poet, novelist, and author of children's books. Her book Song of The Pines: A Story of Norwegian Lumbering in Wisconsin, co-written with her husband, Walter Havighurst, was a Newbery Honor recipient in 1950.

Biography

Marion Margaret Boyd was born in Marietta, Ohio. Her father, William Waddell Boyd, was president of the Western College for Women from 1914 to 1931. Marion Boyd attended Western herself, and would later teach English there. She would also teach at adjacent Miami University.

Boyd's first book, Silver Wands, was published in 1923 as part of the Yale Younger Poets series. 

Boyd met Walter Havighurst while teaching at Miami; they had both been assigned the same office. They married in 1930, and Boyd would use her married name of Havighurst for all of her future publications. 

Havighurst's books included Murder in the Stacks (1934), the first modern mystery novel to use an academic library as its setting; Strange Island (1957); and The Sycamore Tree (1960), a book set during the American Civil War that Kirkus Reviews described as written "with grace and feeling."

Havighurst also collaborated with her husband on three children's books: High Prairie (1944), Song of the Pines (1949), and Climb a Lofty Ladder (1952). Song of the Pines was one of five Newbery Honor titles named in 1950.

Havighurst died on February 24, 1974, at the McCullough-Hyde Memorial Hospital in Oxford, Ohio. She was survived by her husband; her remains were cremated.

References

1894 births
1974 deaths
American children's writers
American women poets
American women novelists
Newbery Honor winners
American women children's writers